Mohammad Hadi Zahedivafa (born 1962) is an Iranian politician, formerly served as acting Labour and Social Welfare Minister in the Government of Ebrahim Raisi from 14 June 2022 to 19 October 2022 replacing Hojjatollah Abdolmaleki.

References 

1962 births
Living people
21st-century Iranian politicians
Government ministers of Iran
University of Ottawa alumni